Elections for the Rodrigues Regional Assembly were held on 12 February 2017. They were the fourth election of the island's regional parliament since Rodrigues obtained autonomous status within the Republic of Mauritius in 2001. The Rodrigues People's Organisation won 10 of the 17 seats.

Results

References

Politics of Rodrigues
Elections in Mauritius
Rodrigues
2017 in Mauritius
Rodrigues